The United States competed at the 2020 Winter Youth Olympics in Lausanne, Switzerland from 9 to 22 January 2020.

Medalists
Medals awarded to participants of mixed-NOC teams are represented in italics. These medals are not counted towards the individual NOC medal tally.

Alpine skiing

Boys

Girls

Mixed

Biathlon

Boys

Girls

Mixed

Bobsleigh

Cross-country skiing

Boys

Girls

Curling

United States qualified a mixed team of four athletes.

Mixed team

Summary

Mixed doubles

Summary

Figure skating

8 American figure skaters achieved quota places for the USA delegation based on the results of the 2019 World Junior Figure Skating Championships.

Singles

Couples

Mixed NOC team trophy

Freestyle skiing

Ski cross

Slopestyle & Big Air

Ice hockey

The United States sent one boys' ice hockey team consisting of 17 athletes.

Boys' tournament
The team roster is listed as follows:

Coaching staff
Head Coach: Scott Paluch
Assistant Coaches: Guy Gosselin, Kevin Reiter

Summary

Luge

Boys

Girls

Mixed team relay

Nordic combined

Individual

Nordic mixed team

Short track speed skating

Three American skaters achieved quota places for the USA delegation based on the results of the 2019 World Junior Short Track Speed Skating Championships.

Boys
 

Girls

Mixed

Skeleton

Ski jumping

Boys

Girls

Mixed

Ski mountaineering

Individual

Sprint

Mixed

Snowboarding

Snowboard cross

Halfpipe, Slopestyle, & Big Air

Speed skating

Boys

Mass Start

Mixed

See also

United States at the 2020 Summer Olympics

References

External links
2020 U.S. Youth Olympic Team

2020 in American sports
Nations at the 2020 Winter Youth Olympics
United States at the Youth Olympics